The 2007–08 Perth Glory FC season was the club's 11th season since its establishment in 1996. The club competed in the A-League for the 3rd time.

The Glory finished 7th in the 2007–08 A-League season, making them the worst Australian team in the A-League, for the second consecutive season. Given the team's promising pre-season performances, expectations at the club were to achieve a top 4 finish, or to at least significantly improve over the performance in the previous A-League season. After a poor start to the season, without a win after the first 11 games and Glory winless for 18 consecutive A-League matches, coach Ron Smith departed and assistant coach, David Mitchell took over for the rest of the season. After 2 wins from his first 4 games in charge, Mitchell was rewarded by having his contract extended till the end of the 2008-09 Season.

Squad changes for 2007-08 season

Players

First team squad

Friendlies 
Malaysian Tour

Perth Glory began their pre-season with three preseason friendlies in Malaysia. Firstly the team defeated Selangor PKNS 3-0 with goals to David Tarka, Naum Sekulovski and Anthony Danze. Perth then moved on to sweep Perak FA 4-0 with a brace to both Nikita Rukavytsya and Jamie Harnwell. Finally, Perth defeated Penang FA 5-1 with another brace to Rukavytsya and goals to Nick Rizzo, Danze and Mate Dragičević.

Local Friendlies

Following the tour of Malaysia, the Perth Glory squad was hit hard by injuries and illness, ahead of a planned series of games against Football West State League sides. Nikolai Topor-Stanley was granted leave due to personal issues, while Mate Dragičević was forced to return to Croatia as a result of visa complications. With only twelve players to call on, Perth Glory succumbed to a 2-1 defeat to Perth SC, with Rukavytsya scoring early in the second half. Perth Glory postponed the remaining friendlies, citing the depletion of their playing stocks.

Pre-Season Cup 

Perth Glory began their Pre-Season Cup campaign with a 1-0 victory over Newcastle Jets. Jamie Harnwell scored in the second half. However, Perth's injury problems were compounded with Anthony Danze and David Micevski the latest players to be put out of action. Perth Glory rushed to sign Mitchell Prentice ahead of the match in order to boost their playing stocks.

The following week, Perth Glory drew 1-1 with Adelaide United. Nikita Rukavytsya scored in the 53rd minute after being played through by a Jamie Harnwell backheel. Cássio equalised in the 60th minute via a well-taken freekick. Hayden Foxe and Nikolai Topor-Stanley made their debuts for the Glory, with Foxe substituted in the 73rd minute due to a minor knee complaint.

In the third round Perth Glory staged a come-from-behind victory over Melbourne Victory to win 2-1 in Darwin. Nikita Rukavytsya and Jamie Harnwell were the goalscorers. Perth Glory finished equal with Adelaide United on points and second in the group due to goal difference, despite winning the most games in the group.

Perth Glory progressed to the pre-season grand final with a 2-3 away victory to the Central Coast Mariners. Dragicevic opened the scoring for the Glory, with Nick Mrdja equalising before half-time. Goals to Bertos and Tarka in the second half sealed the victory for the Glory, with Sasho Petrovski scoring a consolation goal deep in injury time.

Once again forced to travel interstate, Perth Glory lost the pre-season cup grand final to Adelaide United. Perth led at half-time through a Leo Bertos strike, but second half goals to Cássio and Bruce Djite saw Adelaide take the pre-season cup.

2007-08 Hyundai A-League fixtures

Home-and-Away Season

Notes and references 

2007-08
2007–08 A-League season by team